Nérée is a given name. Notable people with the name include:

Carel de Nerée tot Babberich (1880–1909), Dutch symbolist artist
Nérée Arsenault (1911–1982), Canadian politician and forest engineer
Nérée Beauchemin (1850–1931), French Canadian poet and physician
Nérée Boubée (1806–1862), naturalist, entomologist, geologist, author and a professor at the University of Paris
Nérée Le Noblet Duplessis (1855–1926), politician in the province of Quebec, Canada
Nérée Tétreau (1842–1911), notary, land owner and political figure in Quebec
Pierre-Nérée Dorion (1816–1874), Quebec land surveyor and political figure

See also
Saint-Nérée-de-Bellechasse, Quebec, a village in the Bellechasse Regional County Municipality of Quebec

fr:Nérée